Misano may refer to several places in Italy:

Misano Adriatico, a town in the Province of Rimini, Emilia-Romagna
 Misano World Circuit Marco Simoncelli, an Italian motor racing track located next to the town of Misano Adriatico
Misano di Gera d'Adda, a municipality in the Province of Bergamo, Lombardy
Misano Olona, a civil parish of Bornasco, in the Province of Pavia, Lombardy